Calvertville is an unincorporated community in Highland Township, Greene County, Indiana, United States.

History
A post office was established at Calvertville in 1888, and remained in operation until it was discontinued in 1910. John O. Calvert served as the first postmaster.

Geography

References

Unincorporated communities in Greene County, Indiana
Unincorporated communities in Indiana
Bloomington metropolitan area, Indiana